Samuel Sidibé is the Director of the National Museum of Mali.

Education
In 1975, he received a master's degree in Art History and Archaeology from the University of Clermont-Ferrand.

In 1980, he received a Ph.D. in History of African Societies from the Sorbonne.

Awards
In 2006, Sidibé was awarded the Prince Claus Prize.

He is an Officer of the Ordre des Arts et des Lettres.

Advisory Position
He sits on the advisory board of the Stiftung Preußischer Kulturbesitz.

References

External links
 Bamako 2011: Interview with Samuel Sidibé

Living people
Directors of museums in Mali
University of Paris alumni
Year of birth missing (living people)
21st-century Malian people